Eleazar Moiseevich Meletinskii (also Meletinsky or Meletinskij; ; 22 October 1918, Kharkiv – 17 December 2005, Moscow) was a Russian scholar famous for his seminal studies of folklore, literature, philology and the history and theory of narrative; he was one of the major figures of Russian academia in those fields.

He was Director of the Institute for Advanced Studies in the Humanities at Russian State University for the Humanities for several years until his death.

His analysis of comic doublets
The traditions of the mythological narration, dealt with the figures of the ancestors-heroes civilizers, and their comic-demoniac doublets. Bakhtin summarized Meletinsky's analysis in his work on Rabelais:

This double aspect of the world and of human life [the existence of a second world and life outside officialdom] existed even at the earliest stages of cultural development, in the folklore of primitive peoples. Coupled with the cults which were serious in tone and organization were other, comic cults which laughed and scoffed at the deity ("ritual laughter"); coupled with serious myths were comic and abusive ones; coupled with heroes were their parodies and doublets. These comic rituals and myths have attracted the attention of folklorists.

Meletinsky also cites Frejdenberg's analysis of the comic alter egos of the heroes.

In a class-based society, ritual laughter in popular culture creates an anti-clerical world of feasts, playful parody, and carnivals.

Hermes is a deified trickster, and Ulysses, the main character of the Odyssey, has a matrilinear discent from Hermes. In the Legendary Troy the mythological element also includes comic moments.

Origins of Heroic Epic
In his 1963 work "Origins of Heroic Epic: early forms and archaic monuments", Meletinsky studied and compared elements of four ancient civilizations: Karelian-Finnish (pp. 95–155), Caucasian (156-246), Turkic-Mongolian (247-374) and Sumerian-Akkadian (375-422). Here the author examines very ancient myths and their role in the formation of the archaic epic. Among the discussed ones is the Alpamysh, ancient Turkic epic.

Meletinskii also makes an interesting analysis of comic doublets (particularly in "Primary sources epic" pp. 55–58, bibliography included).

The book also contains a bibliography (pp. 449–459), Primary sources epic (21-94).

Notes

List of works
1963, Proiskhozhdenie geroicheskogo éposa. Rannie formy i arkhaicheskie pamiatniki (meaning "The origins of the heroic epic: early forms and archaic monuments"). Moscow. (462 pages)      
1964 Primitive heritage in archaic epics, Reports of the International Congress of anthropological and ethnological sciences, Moscou : Nauka.
1976, Poetika Mifa
1977 Mif i istoricheskaia poetika folklora (Mythe et la poétique historique du folklore), Moscou : Nauka.
1986, Vvedenie v istoričeskuû poétiku éposa i romana. Moscow, Nauka.
Introduzione alla poetica storica dell'epos e del romanzo (1993) 
Dostoevskii v Svete Istoricheskoi Poetiki; 
1996, MELETINSKY E. M. (1)  ; BELMONT N. La poétique historique du folklore narratif (The historic poetry of folklore narratives); journal: Ethnologie française  ; 1996, vol. 26, no 4, pp. 573–747 (dissem.), pp. 611–618 
Kak Sdelany “Brat’ia Karamazovy (1996) 
1998, E.M. Meletinskii. Izbrannye Stat’i. Vospominaniia 
2000, The Poetics of Myth translated by Guy Lanoue and Alexandre Sadetsky
2001, Zametki o Tvorchestve Dostoevskogo

See also
Emil Draitser

References 
Mark Lipovetsky (2003) New Russians as a Cultural Myth Russian Review 62 (1), 54–71.
Seth Benedict Graham A CULTURAL ANALYSIS OF THE RUSSO-SOVIET ANEKDOT 2003
Laura Beraha The Fixed Fool: Raising and Resisting Picaresque Mobility in Vladimir Vojnovic's Conkin Novels The Slavic and East European Journal, Vol. 40, No. 3 (Autumn, 1996), pp. 475–493

External links
Brief obituary and photo 
The Archaic Epic and Its Relationship to Ritual

Russian folklorists
Mythographers
Russian literary critics
1918 births
2005 deaths
Soviet literary historians
Soviet male writers
20th-century Russian male writers
Moscow State University alumni